Manshankar Ninama is a member of the Bharatiya Janata Party and has won the 2014 Indian general elections from the Banswara (Lok Sabha constituency).

References

Living people
India MPs 2014–2019
People from Banswara district
Bharatiya Janata Party politicians from Rajasthan
Lok Sabha members from Rajasthan
1959 births